Group B of the 2007 Copa América was one of the three groups of competing nations in the 2007 Copa América. It comprised Brazil, Chile, Ecuador, and invitee Mexico. The group matches ran from 27 June to 4 July 2007.

Mexico, Brazil and Chile advanced from the group to the knockout phase.

Standings

Matches
All times are in local, Venezuela Time (UTC−04:00).

Ecuador v Chile

Brazil v Mexico

Brazil v Chile

Mexico v Ecuador

Mexico v Chile

Brazil v Ecuador

External links
2007 Copa América at RSSSF

Group B
Brazil at the 2007 Copa América
Chile at the 2007 Copa América
2007 in Ecuadorian football
2006–07 in Mexican football